Oliver Rohrbeck (born March 21, 1965 in Berlin, Germany) is a German television and voice actor.

His television career includes appearances in shows like Sesame Street, Derrick and Balko.

He is better known for his work as a voice actor, his most famous role being Justus Jonas (Jupiter Jones) in the German version of the audio drama series "Three Investigators". He was cast for this role in 1978 and still provides the voice for this character, as well as his fellows Jens Wawrczek and Andreas Fröhlich (who dub Pete Crenshaw and Bob Andrews, respectively). Since 2003, they toured the country multiple times to performs plays in front of a live audience, since the series is still very popular in Germany. In 2014, they broke a Guinness World Record when performing the play Phonophobia in front of 20,000 people at the Waldbühne in Berlin.

Rohrbeck provides his voice for actors like Ben Stiller, Chris Rock, Michael Rapaport, Malcolm-Jamal Warner as Theodore Huxtable on The Cosby Show, Greg Germann in Ally McBeal and many animated characters like Gru in Despicable Me.

In addition, Rohrbeck works as an audio book and dubbing director, e.g. for the German localizations of The Green Mile, Rush Hour, 8 Mile.

External links

Agency Marina Schramm 
Rohrbeck's appearances as a voice artist 

1965 births
Living people
German male television actors
German male voice actors
German voice directors
Male actors from Berlin